At Heart is the third studio album by American metalcore band Miss May I. The album was scheduled for release on May 29, 2012, but delayed to June 12, 2012. At Heart generally received positive reviews, noting the "mature" shift in sound with the band. The first single released from it was "Hey Mister" along with its accompanying music video.

The album entered the Billboard 200 at number 32, selling over 12,000 copies in its first week.

Release 
Throughout the beginning of 2012, Miss May I were recording a new album for release some time during the summer. On March 8, 2012, the band announced that they had completed work on their new album titled At Heart and were set to release it on May 29, 2012. However, according to an interview by Levi Benton with, in order to incorporate last minute changes the band delayed the release to June 12. The first song leaked was "Hey Mister" that Rise Records premiered onto YouTube.
 
Benton used his "thank yous" in album to propose to his wife, Jojo Bitter.

Track listing

Personnel 
Miss May I
 Levi Benton - lead vocals
 B.J. Stead - lead guitar
 Ryan Neff - bass guitar, clean vocals
 Justin Aufdemkampe - rhythm guitar
 Jerod Boyd - drums, percussion

Production
 Machine - producer, engineering, mixing
 Brian Gardner - mastering
 Alberto de Icaza - co-mixing
 Mark Bucci - assistant
 Adam Cichocki - assistant
 Randy LeBeouf - assistant
 Chris Rubey - assistant
 Nick Scott - engineering/co-production
 Clinton Bradley - sound design
 Zac Schwiet - design
 Rick Wait - photography

References 

Miss May I albums
2012 albums
Rise Records albums
Albums produced by Machine (producer)